Cassis madagascariensis, common name the queen helmet, is a marine gastropod mollusc in the family Cassidae, the helmet shells and bonnet shells.

Distribution
This species occurs in the tropical Western Atlantic, the Gulf of Mexico and the Caribbean Sea. The specific name "madagascarensis" literally means "of Madagascar", but this was a misunderstanding of the type locality by the original author.

Description 
The maximum recorded shell length is 409 mm.

Habitat 
United States Virgin Islands, St. John. Emperor/Queen Helmet Snails frequently observed (photographed) in depths as shallow as two feet. This contradicts the previously reported minimum depth of 3 m. The maximum recorded depth is 183 m.

Human uses 

Shells of Cassis madagascariensis are used in jewellery to make cameos. In the Maldives the shell is boiled and the boiled water of the shell is used as a traditional remedy for Flu and fever like symptoms.

References 

 Rosenberg, G.; Moretzsohn, F.; García, E. F. (2009). Gastropoda (Mollusca) of the Gulf of Mexico, Pp. 579–699 in: Felder, D.L. and D.K. Camp (eds.), Gulf of Mexico–Origins, Waters, and Biota. Texas A&M Press, College Station, Texas.

External links 
 
 

Cassidae
Gastropods described in 1822